Ray Walker may refer to:

Ray Walker (artist) (1945–1984), British mural artist
Ray Walker (actor)  (1904–1980), American actor in The Adventures of Superboy
Ray Walker (singer) (born 1934), member of the singing group The Jordanaires
Ray Walker (Australian rules footballer) (born 1941), Australian rules footballer
Ray Walker (footballer, born 1963), English footballer